David Phelps Abbott (September 22, 1863 – June 12, 1934) was an American magician, author and inventor known for creating effects such as the floating ball, as well as for his publications exposing mediums.

Biography 
David Abbott was born in 1863 near Falls City and lived most of his life in Omaha. He was married to Fannie E. Abbott. He became a wealthy businessman in the American Mid-West. He was well versed in arts and science. After Albert Einstein published his theory of relativity, Abbott attempted to explain it in a newspaper article.

As a magician, he performed for invited guests in his private theater he built at his home from 1907 until he died. There he demonstrated his Talking Teakettle (around 1907, decades before miniature radio electronics came into use) and Talking Vase (in 1909). Abbott built his work of magic and deception on the devious principles he learned from spirit mediums. Many of the greats in magic– Kellar, Thurston, Horace Goldin, Theo Bamberg, Ching Ling Foo, Blackstone and Houdini among others–made pilgrimages to Omaha Field Club neighborhood "Mystery House" to be dumbfounded and to learn.

Abbott was a friend of the magician Harry Houdini. His most well known work was Behind the Scenes with the Mediums published in 1907, which went through several editions.

In 1934, Abbott died of diabetes. His burial was at Westlawn-Hillcrest Memorial Park, Omaha, Nebraska.

Abbott wrote a second full-length book, describing not only the séances given in his home but many magical feats which had astounded top professional performers; he died before it could be published, and for a long time the manuscript could not be found. When the Abbott home was sold in 1936, the manuscript was thought to be lost. It was discovered by Walter Graham and published as David P. Abbott's Book Of Mysteries in 1977.

Publications

 Behind the Scenes with the Mediums (1907)
Spirit Slate-Writing and Billet Tests (1907)
The Marvelous Creations of Joseffy (1908)
The History of a Strange Case (1908)
The Spirit Portrait Mystery: Its Final Solution (1913)
David P. Abbott's Book of Mysteries, published posthumously by Walter Graham (1977)

References

Further reading
Hereward Carrington. (1907). Book Review: Behind the Scenes with the Mediums. Journal of the American Society for Psychical Research 1: 492-493.
Brief Biography at The Magic Nook
 Karr, Todd. . Excerpt from Teller and Todd Karr, eds., House of Mystery: The Magic Science of David P. Abbott (The Miracle Factory, Los Angeles, 2005).

External links
 
 
 
 Abowitz, Richard. "A man, a ball, a hoop, a bench (and an alleged thread)… Teller!", Las Vegas Weekly, November 20, 2008
 
A collection of photographs of Mr. and Mrs. D. P. Abbott and their home at Omaha, Nebraska, held by the Billy Rose Theatre Division, New York Public Library for the Performing Arts
Omaha Magical Society Donates Library, University of Nebraska at Omaha Libraries. 

Place of death missing
1863 births
1934 deaths
19th-century American writers
20th-century American male writers
American magicians
American non-fiction writers
American skeptics
Deaths from diabetes
Harry Houdini
People from Falls City, Nebraska
Male non-fiction writers